Nawagai Subdivision is a subdivision located in Bajaur District, Khyber Pakhtunkhwa, Pakistan. The population is 79,002 according to the 2017 census.

See also 
 Nawagai
 List of tehsils of the Federally Administered Tribal Areas

References 

Tehsils of Khyber Pakhtunkhwa
Populated places in Bajaur District